Mikhail Alekseyevich Martinovich (born 14 September 1979) is a Belarusian football coach and former player.

Honours
Shakhtyor Soligorsk
Belarusian Premier League champion: 2005

External links

1979 births
Living people
People from Mazyr
Sportspeople from Gomel Region
Belarusian footballers
Belarus under-21 international footballers
Association football midfielders
Belarusian Premier League players
FC Shakhtyor Soligorsk players
FC Slavia Mozyr players
FC Granit Mikashevichi players
FC Torpedo Minsk players
FC Energetik-BGU Minsk players
Belarusian football managers
FC Slavia Mozyr managers